Lilium pensylvanicum is an Asian plant species of the family Liliaceae. Sometimes called the Siberian lily, it is native to a cold climate and needs frost in the winter. It is found in the wild form in Siberia, the Russian Far East, Mongolia, northeast China, Korea and Hokkaidō.

The Latin name is misleading due to an error by the botanist John Bellenden Ker.

Description
The plant flowers in June and July with one to six upright, dish-shaped flowers. The flower consists of six tepals curving backward from the center. The seeds mature from August to September.

Distribution in Japan
Lilium pensylvanicum is abundant in the wild form in the Notsuke Peninsula. The city Koshimizu, on the island of Hokkaidō, is known as the city of the ezosukashiyuri flowers. In the Ainu language, the flowers are called  and that is also the traditional Ainu oil lamp made from a large mussel shell and supported on a three-forked stick.

Cultivation
Lilium pensylvanicum is very undemanding and is easily cultivated. It is sensitive only in relation to drought. Thus the plant is popular in European and American gardens.

References

External links

pensylvanicum
Flora of China
Flora of Siberia
Flora of the Russian Far East
Flora of Mongolia
Flora of Eastern Asia
Plants described in 1805